Catagonium brevicaudatum is a species of moss from the genus Catagonium. It was founded by Müller and Brotherus in 1897.  It is commonly found in the Americas.   Before the name Catagonium brevicaudatum, it has other names including: Eucatagonium brevicaudatum, Hypnum brevicaudatum, and Isopterygium brevicaudatum.  The stems of Catagonium brevicaudatum are mostly 2–10 cm.

References

Hypnales
Plants described in 1897
Taxa named by Karl Müller (bryologist)
Taxa named by Viktor Ferdinand Brotherus